is a short urban Autobahn in Western Berlin, Germany connecting to the A 100. Before reunification, it was called the A 13.

Exit list 

 
|}

External links 

103
A103